Uniondale High School is a public high school located in Uniondale, Nassau County, New York, U.S.A., and is the only high school operated by the Uniondale Union Free School District.

As of the 2014-15 school year, the school had an enrollment of 2,220 students and 153.0 classroom teachers (on an FTE basis), for a student–teacher ratio of 14.5:1. There were 1,187 students (53.5% of enrollment) eligible for free lunch and 251 (11.3% of students) eligible for reduced-cost lunch.

Alumni

Taylor Darling, politician, New York State Assembly  (18th District) 
Jennifer Carroll, politician, 18th Lieutenant Governor of the U.S. state of Florida, served in the Florida House of Representatives from 2003 until 2010.
Harry T. Edwards, Senior Circuit Judge and Chief Judge Emeritus on the United States Court of Appeals for the D.C. Circuit in Washington, D.C. ; Professor of Law at the New York University School of Law.
Jimmy Lewis, All-American lacrosse player at Navy from 1964 to 1966 
Sheryl Lee Ralph, Broadway actress and singer.
Lou Santiago, television host of MuscleCar, Ultimate Car Build-Off, and Car Fix
Gregory Sleet, Chief Judge of the United States District Court for the District of Delaware
Willie Smith, sprinter, won gold at the 1984 Olympics as part of the 4 × 400 m relay squad
Aljamain Sterling, professional mixed martial artist, current UFC Bantamweight Champion
Alex Stewart, former NFL player
Andrew Stewart, former NFL player
Andrew Quarless, NFL Tight End for the Green Bay Packers
Busta Rhymes, rapper
John Moschitta Jr., singer, actor, voice actor
Gary "Baba Booey" Dell'Abate, radio producer

Footnotes

External links
Uniondale High School official website

Schools in Nassau County, New York
Public high schools in New York (state)